SeaRose FPSO is a floating production, storage and offloading vessel located in the White Rose oil and gas field, approximately 350 kilometres (217 Nm) east-southeast off the coast of Newfoundland, Canada in the North Atlantic Ocean. The White Rose field is operated by Husky Energy, with a 72.5% interest, with Petro-Canada owning a 27.5% share.

All three fields are in the Jeanne d'Arc Basin on the eastern edge of the famous Grand Banks fishing territory.

SeaRose made her way from the Samsung Heavy Industries shipyard in Geoje South Korea to Marystown, Newfoundland, for final preparation, in April 2004; a  trip that took two months. In August 2005 she left Marystown for her work duty at Husky Energy's White Rose oil field.

In January 2018, the C-NLOPB suspended White Rose operations because of Husky's failure to disconnect when an iceberg approached, contrary to Husky's ice management plan.

References

External links
 SeaRose at Ship Technology
 "SeaRose FPSO Husky’s White Rose floater preparing to make sail" from Ocean Resources
 "SeaRose FPSO Arrives at White Rose Oil Field" from Rigzone
 "Husky Energy's SeaRose FPSO Arrives in Marystown" at Rigzone
 White Rose at Huskey Energy
 White Rose field @ Offshore Technology

Floating production storage and offloading vessels
Service vessels of Canada
Petroleum industry in Canada
2004 ships
Economy of Newfoundland and Labrador
Ships built by Samsung Heavy Industries
Oil platforms off Canada